Morton is a locality in the parish of Kirknewton, in West Lothian, Scotland.

The locality has given its name to Morton Hill, Morton Burn and Upper and Lower Morton Reservoirs.

History
There is a prehistoric and modern cairn in Morton situated on a grassy ridge of Corston Hill. The prehistoric cairn is a burial cairn of Late Neolithic or Bronze Age period. It is a scheduled monument of national importance.

Morton Hill is an area with extensive evidence of historical farming and sheepherding, including rig and furrow cultivation.

The name of the area and ownership is historically that of the Earls of Morton.

Economy

There is a trout Fishery in Morton. The fishery primarily uses Morton Reservoir, a large freshwater reservoir. There is also an Upper and Lower reservoir.

There is a shooting range and clay gun sports facility in Morton.

Notes

References

West Lothian
Late Neolithic